Rybarski (feminine: Rybarska) is a Polish surname. Notable people with the surname include:

Jan Rybarski (born 1941), conductor and organist
Roman Rybarski (1887–1942), Polish economist and politician

Polish-language surnames